Sorong is a chartered coastal city of West Papua province of Indonesia.

Sorong may also refer to:

 Sorong Regency, an administrative subdivision of West Papua province of Indonesia
 South Sorong Regency, an administrative subdivision of West Papua province of Indonesia